José Gerardo Rocha Moreira Júnior (born 19 November 1977), known as Júnior Cearense, is a Brazilian football coach and former player who played as a midfielder. He is the current head coach of Maracanã.

Career
He is a medium very esperiente, shot went through several clubs in Brazil, among them rival Ceará, Fortaleza.

Contract
 Ceará.

See also
Football in Brazil
List of football clubs in Brazil

References

External links
zerozerofootball.com

1977 births
Living people
Sportspeople from Fortaleza
Brazilian footballers
Association football midfielders
Campeonato Brasileiro Série A players
Campeonato Brasileiro Série B players
Campeonato Brasileiro Série C players
Campeonato Brasileiro Série D players
Associação Esportiva Tiradentes players
Fortaleza Esporte Clube players
Ferroviário Atlético Clube (CE) players
Guarany Sporting Club players
Ceará Sporting Club players
Campinense Clube players
Horizonte Futebol Clube players
FC Atlético Cearense players
Brazilian football managers